Stuart Weinblatt is an ordained rabbi and the President of the Rabbinic Cabinet of the Jewish Federations of North America. He is the senior rabbi of Congregation B’nai Tzedek in Potomac, Maryland. He and his wife founded the Conservative synagogue in 1988 with only a handful of families. The congregation’s membership is now over 650 families. Rabbi Weinblatt also served as Director of Israel Policy and Advocacy for the Rabbinical Assembly starting in 2009 and was tapped by the Jewish National Fund to head up and organize their "Rabbis for Israel" affinity group.

Biography
Rabbi Weinblatt graduated from the University of Maryland in 1974 with high honors in history. During his time as a student, he served as Director of State Affairs, and acted as the representative of the student government to the Maryland State government. In these roles, he lobbied and spoke before numerous committees of the State legislature, and conducted a highly successful voter registration drive. He also chaired the Committee for Jewish Studies at the university, which led to the creation of several faculty positions in Jewish Studies. Because of these achievements during his undergraduate career, Rabbi Weinblatt was elected to Who’s Who in American Colleges and Universities in 1973. Rabbi Weinblatt was elected president of his senior class at Hebrew Union College in Cincinnati, where he was ordained in 1979.

Career & activities
Rabbi Weinblatt has held a number of leadership positions in Jewish organizations at both the local and national level. He has chaired the National Convention of the Rabbinical Assembly, served as President of the Washington Board of Rabbis, and chaired the Annual Israel Bonds Ambassador’s Ball.

Rabbi Weinblatt has given the opening prayer as a guest chaplain for sessions of the U.S. House of Representatives, the United States Senate, the inaugurations of Maryland’s Governors and Montgomery County Executives, both houses of the Maryland State legislature, and many other public gatherings.

Rabbi Weinblatt has been an adjunct professor at Wesley Theological Seminary since 1992, teaching Jewish history and theology. As a result of his teaching, he was selected as a Bronfman Fellow by CLAL and as a Senior Rabbinic Fellow at the Shalom Hartman Institute of Jerusalem. Rabbi Weinblatt is the author of many articles, poems, and op-ed pieces concerning Israel and other Jewish causes. He has served as a speaker, auctioneer, and emcee for many local charities. His first book ‘’God, Prayer and Spirituality’’ is a compilation of his sermons and articles, and was published in 2008. His second book ‘’Living in the Shadow of Death: A Rabbi Copes with Cancer’’ traces his own battle with cancer and was published in May 2015.

Family
Rabbi Weinblatt and his wife Symcha have four children and four grandchildren.

Awards
Rabbi Weinblatt has been recognized for his leadership and community involvement. In 2002, he was named “Man of the Year” by the Great Washington area chapter of ORT. He received the “Pillar of the Community” award from the Jewish Community Relations Council (JCRC) of Greater Washington in 2007. Weinblatt was named the “Best Rabbi in Washington” in a reader survey conducted by Washington Jewish Week in both 2008 and 2009.  In 2016, he was chosen by the Forward as one of "America's Most Inspiring Rabbis."

Bibliography
God, Prayer and Spirituality (Jay Street Publishers, 2008) 
Living in the Shadow of Death: A Rabbi Copes with Cancer (Urim Publications, 2015)

References

American Conservative rabbis
University of Maryland, College Park alumni
Hebrew Union College – Jewish Institute of Religion alumni
Living people
People from Potomac, Maryland
Year of birth missing (living people)
21st-century American rabbis